Dogern is a municipality in the district of Waldshut in Baden-Württemberg in Germany.

Twin towns
Dogern is twinned with:

  Le Grand-Lemps, France, since 1988

See also
 List of cities and towns in Germany

References

Waldshut (district)
Baden
Germany–Switzerland border crossings